This list of protected areas of Lejre Municipality''' lists protected areas of Lejre Municipality, Denmark.

List

See also

References

Protected
Protected areas of Denmark by municipality